Ltsen is a village in the Sisian Municipality of the Syunik Province in Armenia.

Etymology 
The village is also known as Lizin, Lizhin and Ltse.

Demographics 
The Statistical Committee of Armenia reported its population as 178 in 2010, up from 157 at the 2001 census.

References 

Populated places in Syunik Province